Following is a list of Cuban restaurants:

 Columbia Restaurant
 El Cubo de Cuba, Portland, Oregon, U.S.
 Palomar, Portland, Oregon
 Pambiche Cocina and Repostería Cubana, Portland, Oregon
 Versailles (chain)
 Versailles (restaurant)
 West End Bar

 
Lists of ethnic restaurants